WTB may refer to:

 Walk Thru the Bible Ministries, a Christian educational organization
 Warenterminbörse Hannover, a German futures exchange
 Welsh Tourist Board, former name of the Welsh Assembly Government's tourism team, Visit Wales
 Wilderness Trail Bikes, a US-based bicycle component company
 Wire Train Bus, a fieldbus used in train control systems, and described in IEC 61375
 With The Beatles, the second album by The Beatles
 Toowoomba Wellcamp Airport, IATA airport code